Mammacyon is an extinct genus of medium-sized bear dogs endemic to North America during the Late Oligocene and Early Miocene.

References

Bear dogs
Miocene bear dogs
Oligocene caniforms
Burdigalian genus extinctions
Prehistoric mammals of North America
Oligocene genus first appearances
Prehistoric carnivoran genera